Fernando García (born 10 October 1889, date of death unknown) was a Spanish fencer. He competed in the individual and team foil events at the 1928 Summer Olympics.

References

External links
 

1889 births
Year of death missing
Spanish male foil fencers
Olympic fencers of Spain
Fencers at the 1928 Summer Olympics
Fencers from Madrid